Elizabeth Ely Bogus (born February 24, 1984) is an American soccer coach and retired player who played as a midfielder and forward. She played semi-professionally with Chicago Cobras, Arizona Heatwave, Ajax America Women, Mile High Edge, Pali Blues, and Boston Aztec; at the professional level, she appeared for Los Angeles Sol, Boston Breakers, PK-35 Vantaa, Seattle Reign, and FC Kansas City.

Early life
Born in Provo, Utah, Bogus began playing soccer when she was eight years old. She attended Brighton High School in Cottonwood Heights. With the Bengals, she set records with 79 career goals and 27 assists and earned three UHSAA all-state first team selections; Bogus was named all-state second team as a freshman. As a senior, she was named the Utah High School Player of the Year by Gatorade and the National Soccer Coaches Association of America and was also honored as an honorable mention all-American by the United States Specialty Sports Association.

At the club level, Bogus played with Sparta United SC for two seasons, Utah FC for one, and Firebirds SC for three. Bogus additionally played with the Utah Olympic Development Program (ODP) team for four years and was on the Region IV ODP team for one season. She committed to play college soccer for coach Ray Leone at Arizona State University, part of a recruiting class that also included Manya Makoski.

College and amateur
Bogus attended Arizona State University in Tempe, Arizona. She made an immediate mark on the team her freshman year, when she was named Pac-10 Freshman of the Year. Bogus led the conference in game-winning goals with seven, which tied the school record for a single season. She ranked third in shots (62) and goals (10) and had three assists. She was named to the 2002 All-Pac-10 First Team and Soccer America Magazine's Freshman All-America Team. She was one of 12 finalists for Soccer Buzz Magazine's 2002 National Freshman of the Year.

During her sophomore year, Bogus scored six goals and provided four assists, earning honorable mention accolades from the PAC. In 2004, Bogus scored four goals, including two game winners, and had a team-high five assists. She made the All-conference second team. As senior, Bogus scored 11 goals, including two game winners, and six assists.  She received honors from the Pac-10, making the all-conference first team. SoccerBuzz and ESPN The Magazine both named Bogus to first teams in the West. Bogus finished her career at ASU ranked second in goals (31) and points (80) and third for game-winning goals (12) and assists (18).

Semi-pro leagues, 2004–2008
Bogus played on many semi-professional teams before being drafted by FC Gold Pride in the 2008 WPS General Draft. She moved to Los Angeles before the final rosters were announced.

Professional career

The WPS years, 2009–2011
Los Angeles Sol signed Bogus off waivers for the 2009 season and she appeared in seven games for the club.

In 2010, Bogus was signed as a developmental player by the Boston Breakers and spent the next two seasons playing with the Boston Aztec and the Breakers. She scored three goals and provided one assist in two WPS seasons.

Seattle Reign

On February 7, 2013, Bogus was picked by Seattle Reign FC in the fourth round of the 2013 NWSL Supplemental Draft. During the team's first regular season match against the Chicago Red Stars, Bogus provided the assist on the team's first goal by Christine Nairn. Of the assist, Nairn said, "I had the easy job. If Liz didn't put a perfect ball on my head, I wouldn't have been in the position that I was in." During a home match on July 26, 2013, Bogus scored a goal in the 83rd minute helping the Reign defeat the Chicago Red Stars 4–1. She made 19 appearances for the Reign during the 2013 season, serving two assists and one goal.

On December 5, 2013, it was announced that Bogus had been traded to FC Kansas City for the 2014 season. Of the trade, Reign FC head coach Laura Harvey said, "Liz was a huge part of our group last season and she will be missed...but when we looked at the upcoming season in the context of the changes we have planned, we feared her playing time could be limited. As a result, we felt the trade with Kansas City would be best for all involved."

FC Kansas City
After winning the NWSL championship with FC Kansas City in 2014 and 2015, Bogus announced her retirement from professional soccer on March 1, 2016.

International career
During her freshman year at Arizona State, Bogus was called up for the first time by the United States women's national under-21 soccer team. She spent just "a brief stint" with the team that year and was not called back up until her senior year. In the spring of 2006, Bogus was named to a squad for a three-match tour in Europe, alongside her Sun Devil teammate Manya Makoski. The camp included two unofficial games, against SV Saestum and FCR 2001 Duisburg, and a friendly against the Netherlands.

Coaching career
On January 30, 2017, the University of Utah announced that Bogus would be joining the school as an assistant coach.

Personal life
Bogus majored in business communications at Arizona State, graduating from the W. P. Carey School of Business. Her father, Tom, was a soccer player at BYU and her mother, Brooke Adams, was a volleyball player at Utah Valley State and San Diego.

Career statistics

Honors
Chicago Cobras
 USL W-League Central Conference – Midwest Division: 2004

Ajax America Women
 WPSL West Conference: 2006
 WPSL Pacific Conference – South Division: 2009

Pali Blues
 USL W-League: 2008
 USL W-League (regular season): 2008
 USL W-League Western Conference: 2008, 2012

Los Angeles Sol
 Women's Professional Soccer (regular season): 2009

Boston Aztec
 Women's Premier Soccer League: 2010
 WPSL East Conference – Northeast Division: 2010

PK-35 Vantaa
 Naisten Liiga: 2012
 Finnish Women's Cup: 2012

FC Kansas City
 National Women's Soccer League: 2014, 2015

Individual
 Gatorade Utah Player of the Year: 2002
 NSCAA Utah High School Player of the Year: 2002
 USSAA Honorable Mention All-American: 2002
 Pac-10 Freshman of the Year: 2002
 Soccer America Freshman First Team All-American: 2002
 All-Pac 10 First Team: 2002, 2005
 All-Pac 10 Honorable Mention: 2003
 All-Pac 10 Second Team: 2004
 NSCAA All-Pacific Region Third Team: 2005
 All-WPSL First Team: 2006
 WPSL All-Final Four Tournament Team: 2006

References

External links

 Arizona State profile
 
 
 

Living people
1984 births
American women's soccer players
American women's soccer coaches
Soccer players from Utah
Sportspeople from Provo, Utah
W. P. Carey School of Business alumni
Women's association football utility players
Arizona State Sun Devils women's soccer players
Ajax America Women players
Pali Blues players
Los Angeles Sol players
Boston Breakers players
Boston Aztec (WPSL) players
PK-35 Vantaa (women) players
OL Reign draft picks
OL Reign players
FC Kansas City players
Women's Professional Soccer players
National Women's Soccer League players
USL W-League (1995–2015) players
Women's Premier Soccer League players
Kansallinen Liiga players
American expatriate women's soccer players
Expatriate women's footballers in Finland
American expatriate sportspeople in Finland
Harvard Crimson women's soccer coaches
Utah Utes women's soccer coaches
Chicago Cobras players